Norfolk Islanders also referred to as just Islanders are the inhabitants or citizens of Norfolk Island, an external territory of Australia. The Islanders have their own unique identity and are predominantly people of Pitcairn and English descent and to a lesser extent of Scottish and Irish.

The culture held in common by most native-born Norfolk Islanders is mainstream Norfolk culture, traditions primarily inherited from the 194 Pitcairn settlers in 1856. All of the people that claim Pitcairn ancestry are descended from the British HMS Bounty mutineers and the Tahitian companions, including the few who settled afterwards. 
In the 2016 census, there were 381 Norfolk Island-born residents out of a total of 1,748 inhabiting the island.

There is a small Norfolk Islander diaspora in mainland Australia (particularly New South Wales and Queensland) and New Zealand due to people having relocated temporarily or migrated permanently.

History

Discovery and name
Archaeological findings suggest that the island had previously been used as a stopover for seafaring Polynesians. The final fate of the early settlers remains a mystery.

The first European known to have sighted and landed on the island was Captain James Cook, on his second voyage on HMS Resolution. From New Caledonia to New Zealand Cook came across the island on 10 October 1774. Finding the island uninhabited, Cook claimed it for Britain and named it after English noblewoman Mary Howard, Duchess of Norfolk.

The Norfolk Island Act of 1913 established Norfolk Island as a territory under the authority of the Commonwealth of Australia, transferring the territory from the British crown in July 1914.

British settlement
In 1786 the British government included Norfolk Island as an auxiliary settlement, proposed by Sir John Call. When the First Fleet arrived at Port Jackson in January 1788, its commander, Captain Arthur Phillip, ordered Lieutenant Philip Gidley King to take control of the island and prepare for its commercial development. King arrived there on 6 March 1788 on board HMS Supply.

Norfolk King was born 8 January 1789 on Norfolk Island. He was the first child born on Norfolk Island. With his parents on aboard HMS Supply in March 1790, his name was recorded as "Norfolk King Inett" in the shipping muster. His parents were Lieutenant Phillip Gidley King and female convict Ann Inett.
By 1814 the first penal settlement lay abandoned, until on 6 June 1825 a second penal settlement was established by Captain Richard Turton; it lasted until 1855. The town of New Norfolk, Tasmania was established with the evacuation of Norfolk Island in 1807–1808, named after their former home.

Pitcairn settlers

In 1855 the British Government offered by Queen Victoria gave another choice to the Pitcairn community. Norfolk Island's dreadful second penal settlement had been disbanded and the island was handed by an Imperial Order-In-Council of June 1856, to the people of Pitcairn as a permanent home.
On 3 May 1856, the entire population of 193 (plus a baby (Reuben Denison Christian) born en route; making it 194) along with everything they owned began the five-week voyage aboard the Morayshire to Norfolk Island, arriving on 8 June 1856. These were the descendants of Tahitians and the HMS Bounty mutineers, resettled from the Pitcairn Islands, which had become too small for their growing population. The British government had permitted the transfer of the Pitcairners to Norfolk, which was thus established as a colony separate from New South Wales but under the administration of that colony's governor.

The Pitcairners occupied many of the buildings remaining from the penal settlements, and gradually established their traditional farming and whaling industries on the island. Although some families decided to return, with 17 members of the Young family to Pitcairn in 1858 and 1863, the island's population continued to slowly grow as the island accepted settlers, often arriving with whaling fleets.

Pitcairn descent
In the 2016 census, the question asked was – What is the person's ancestry?, different to previous censuses by the Norfolk Island government. Those who gave a response to the ancestry question showed that 29.6% of the ‘usual residents’ population had Pitcairn ancestry. When broken down as a total ancestry response, there were 484 or 20.0% of all ancestries reported identified as having Pitcairn ancestry. Out of the 53.7% of usual residents population who chose just a single ancestry, 14.8% identified as only ‘Pitcairn’ and 12.4% were part-Pitcairn plus another ancestry. 

An additional 120 people (7 percent of usual residents) chose ‘Norfolk Island’ ancestry with 30 identified as having Pitcairn descent.
The 2011 census (Norfolk Island government) asked a question relating to Pitcairn descent with the questions – "yes, of Pitcairn descent" and "no, not of Pitcairn descent" only of the "Ordinarily Resident Population". 
People of Pitcairn descent may have relocated temporarily or migrated which is a possible factor in the increased number of persons of other descent.
Norfolk's Pitcairn descendants are already at least 7th or 8th generation, and those in younger age groups are probably 9th generation.

Surnames
Among the Islanders, the descendants of the Pitcairners share only a few family names: Adams, Christian, McCoy, Quintal, and Young are the "Bounty mutineer names"; Buffett, Evans, and Nobbs are "Pitcairn names" – descended from the two Englishmen and one Welshman who married into the mutineer families on Pitcairn; and Blucher, Bataille, Robinson, Snell, Rossiter, and Bailey are among the "Norfolk names".

Demographics

Birthplace
In the 2016 census, native-born Norfolk Islanders were 22.1% of the total population. Table shows the most recent 2016 census data of the population by birthplace.
Immigration flow from mainland Australia and New Zealand has been a substantial proportion of the population throughout the 20th century to the present-day. Those born in Norfolk Island have been in steady decline since the 1947 census where they formed a majority of 52% of the total population.

Age
The median age of people in Norfolk Island (State Suburbs) was 49 years. Children aged 0–14 years made up 16.9% of the population and people aged 65 years and over made up 23.8% of the population.

Language

English and Norfuk are the official languages. In 2004 an act of the Norfolk Island Assembly made Norfuk a co-official language of the island. In Norfolk Island (State Suburbs), 45.5% of people only spoke English, while 40.9% spoke Norf'k-Pitcairn at home originally introduced by Pitkern-speaking settlers.
2016 census: 
English (only spoken at home) 789 (45.5%)
Norf'k-Pitcairn – 709 (40.9%)
Fijian – 35 (2.0%)
Filipino/Tagalog – 32 (1.8%)
Mandarin – 12 (0.7%)

Culture

Bounty Day is a national holiday primarily celebrated by islanders of Pitcairn heritage on 8 June, held in the World Heritage area of Kingston, the day that the descendants of the mutineers arrived on the island. The Islander's re-enact the landing of the Pitcairners on the island and is named for the ship HMS Bounty. Another celebration is Thanksgiving held on the last Wednesday of November, similar to the pre–World War II American observance on the last Thursday of the month. This means the Norfolk Island observance is the day before or six days after the United States' observance. The holiday was brought to the island by visiting American whaling ships.

Religion

The most common religious affiliation in Norfolk Island (State Suburbs) were Anglican 29.5%, No Religion, so described 26.8%, Catholic 12.6%, Uniting Church 9.6% and Not stated 9.6%. In Norfolk Island (State Suburbs), Christianity was the largest religious group reported overall (68.5%) (this figure excludes not stated responses).

Sport

Cricket is recorded as having been played on Norfolk Island, an external territory of Australia, as early as 1838, by soldiers stationed on the island. It continued to be played after the island was settled in 1856 by Pitcairn settlers.

Cuisine
The cuisine of Norfolk Island is very similar to that of the Pitcairn Islands, as Norfolk Islanders trace their origins to Pitcairn. The local cuisine is a blend of British cuisine and Tahitian cuisine.

Recipes from Norfolk Island of Pitcairn origin include mudda (green banana dumplings) and kumara pilhi. The islands cuisine also contains American influences not found in Pitcairn, such as chopped salads and fruit pies, due to the influences of American whalers.

Diaspora
According to the 2013 New Zealand census, 96 people listed their birthplace as Norfolk Island. This increased to 108 people (usually resident population) born in Norfolk Island in the 2018 census.

Historical demographics

Population by birthplace, 1933
The results below show the total population of the Island in the 1933 census by their place of birth, with a slight majority being Norfolk Island-born. Native Norfolk Islanders were over 53% of the population, 30% were mainland Australians and New Zealanders, with around 12% born in Europe.

Notable people
Notable people from, or associated with Norfolk Island include:

 Philip Parker King
 Andre Nobbs
 Eve Semple
 Malcolm Champion

Gallery

See also

Descendants of the Bounty mutineers
Europeans in Oceania
List of Oceanian countries by population
Pitcairn Islands

References

1856 establishments in the United Kingdom
1914 establishments in Australia
Ethnic groups in Australia
Ethnic groups in Oceania
European diaspora in Oceania